Howard James Dinkins Jr. (born April 26, 1969) is a former American football linebacker. He played his college football at Florida State.

References 

1969 births
Living people
Jean Ribault High School alumni
Players of American football from Jacksonville, Florida
American football linebackers
Florida State Seminoles football players
Atlanta Falcons players